Tribalistas is the second studio album by Brazilian supergroup Tribalistas, a trio consisting of Marisa Monte, Arnaldo Antunes and Carlinhos Brown. It was released on 25 August 2017, 15 years after their successful debut album.

Background 
In 2002, longtime partners Marisa Monte, Arnaldo Antunes and Carlinhos Brown formed supergroup Tribalistas. Their first album was released by the end of that year in Brazil and in the rest of the World in the following year. It was a huge success, topping charts and reaching diamond status after selling 1,5 million copies in the country, even with no promotion or interviews. They also received five nominations for the Latin Grammy Awards, winning one: Best Portuguese Language Contemporary Pop Album.

In 2013, they released a single titled "Joga Arroz" ("Throw Rice") in support of same-sex civil marriage. The song was featured at the website of the Casamento Civil Igualitário ("Egalitarian Civil Marriage") campaign, promoted by federal congressman Jean Wyllys. It did not receive TV and radio airplay, either.

Throughout 2016, Monte, Antunes and Brown traveled a couple of times to Salvador, Bahia, where they composed two or three songs a day. These sessions resulted in around 20 new songs.

Later, in November, Monte had Antunes and Brown as surprise guests at her show at Concha Acústica de Salvador. Together,  they performed "Velha Infância", "Já Sei Namorar" and "Passe em Casa". The surprise performance led the media to speculate on a possible Tribalistas reunion.

Release and promotion 
The three members announced their return during a surprise live session held simultaneously at each of their official Facebook pages. In the video, they revealed four new tracks: "Diáspora", "Aliança", "Um Só" and "Fora da Memória".

The group also announced partnerships with Pedro Baby and Pretinho da Serrinha on two songs. A DVD, shot during the album recording sections between March and April 2017, was also confirmed. Additionally, a TV special called "Especial Tribalistas" was aired on 31 August on Rede Globo.

The album also received a hand album edition, an exclusive digital booklet with the songs, videos, chord charts, technical information and pictures of the trio during the recording sessions. The hand album is a partnership with Facebook and Spotify.

Later, on 28 March 2018, Monte, Antunes and Brown officially announced the much speculated and requested Tribalistas Tour 2018, the first by the trio. It brought them to ten Brazilian state capitals, including Salvador, Rio de Janeiro, Recife, Fortaleza, São Paulo, Porto Alegre, Belém, Curitiba, Brasília and Belo Horizonte.

Cover art and booklet

CD and DVD 
The cover art of the album features artwork by Luiz Zerbini, a friend of the three members and a renowned Brazilian multimedia artist. He followed the album recordings and produced illustrations of the band members as the songs were created and recorded.

Hand album 
The album was released on a special edition called Hand Album and created in partnership with Facebook and Spotify. It was a request by the members to give a different meaning to the consuming of digital music. The platform was developed by Brazilians after a programming marathon held in Rio de Janeiro and prototypes tests until they reached a language that was easy to the public. The platform was then finished by professionals from the United States and Europe.

Track listing

Reception

Critical reception 

Tribalistas received mixed to negative reviews from critics, with many considering it inferior to the trio's 2002 debut and some even labeling it as "unnecessary".

Writing for Zero Hora, Alexandre Lucchese expressed disbelief that the album would repeat the commercial success of its predecessor, but stated it shouldn't be a failure, either. He pointed the political and non-partisan tone as evidence of the band's maturing, called the title "lazy" and praised the track "Um Só", although he considered it a repetition of "Tribalistas", from the first album. He concluded his analysis by saying that "the album hardly creates estrangement or disgust, although it is also little likely to generate great empathy – and euphoria would be asking too much".

Marco Aurélio Canônico was more critical of the album, calling it "less creative, less inspired, less necessary". He said the similar sound of both albums could be seen both as "identity" and as "sign of creative fatigue". On the other hand, he considered that the songs authored by the three members alone work better than the partnerships. He concluded his text by stating that "in the cynical and bellicose times that lie ahead, Tribalistas look out of place with their peace and love spirit –perhaps precisely because of this they are necessary. But their new album show a trio that is not only smaller than the sum of its isolated parts, but than what it once was".

In his blog at R7, Helder Maldonado said the album "drags on on songs with little inspired arrangements and ideologically engaged lyrics". For him, the album fails to repeat the "elegance" of their debut and is "almost hermetic and overly focused on introspection". Besides that, he considered that the guest performances of other musicians decharacterized the project. Finally, he said that "maybe Tribalistas really wanted to innovate and release something completely different from the album that consecrated them. And they did it. And changing is always healthy. The problem is that it's not always for the better."

Writing for O Globo, Bernardo Araujo considered that the album comes "without a crisis, but without great moments, either" and that "big fans of the trio will, once more, enjoy it a lot, but Tribalistas, once more, appear to be having more fun than the public". Speaking specifically about the opening track "Diáspora", he considered it "bad luck" that the song was released on the same day as "As Caravanas", by Chico Buarque (a song that deals with the same theme).

At Hoje em Dia, Lucas Buzatti stated that the album "stumble upon the attempt of reproducing the feat [of their debut] with old formulas and repetitive themes". He praised the tracks "Diáspora", "Fora da Memória" and "Trabalivre", but criticized "Um Só", "Aliança", "Baião do Mundo" and "Ânima", writing mixed comments about "Feliz e Saudável", "Lutar e Vencer" and "Os Peixinhos". He ended his text by saying that "Tribalistas gets stuck at the more of the same. If on one hand the trio establishes its signature sound, on the other hand they expose a frustrating predictability for people waiting for something new."

Adriana Del Ré, from O Estado de S. Paulo, wrote a positive review about the album. She said that the return preserving "the tribalistic DNA" was a "relief" and that reuniting without doing so wouldn't make sense. On the other hand, she noted a change in the lyrics, which went from "a certain innocence" on the 2002 album to "a more politicized attitude" on the 2017 release.

Charts

Soundtrack 
 "Aliança" was part of the soundtrack for the 9 pm telenovela O Outro Lado do Paraíso (2017), by Rede Globo.
 "Um Só" is part of the soundtrack for the series Malhação: Vidas Brasileiras (2018), also by Rede Globo.

Awards and nominations

Personnel 
Taken from the album booklet:

 Managing
 Monte Criação e Produção Ltda. (Phonomotor): label, owner of copyrights/phonographic copyrights
 Rosa Celeste (Universal Music Publishing Group): national/international distribution, licensing
 Ed. Candyall Music (SLEM): editor
 Published by Monte Songs and Sony/ATV Tree Publishing

 Visuals and images

 Cover artwork: Luiz Zerbini 
 Graphical project: Lêka Coutinho and Fabiano Feroli
 graphic coordination: Geysa Adnet
 Reviewing: Luiz Augusto

 Social media: Marco Froner and Carol Coelho
 Chord charts: Dadi Carvalho
 Clearances: Solange Ruiz

Produção

 Production: Marisa Monte
 Co-production: Arnaldo Antunes, Carlinhos Brown, Alê Siqueira and Daniel Carvalho
 Production director: Leonardo Netto
 Recording: Alê Siqueira e Daniel Carvalho

 Editing: Alê Siqueira, Daniel Carvalho e Marisa Monte
 Mixing and mastering: Daniel Carvalho
 Executive production: Suely Aguiar
 Studio coordination: Marcio Barros

Instrumentation

 Marisa Monte: lead vocals, acoustic guitar, claps, reco-reco, mouth percussion, Fender Rhodes, Hammond, pandeiro, wooden spoon and melodica
 Arnaldo Antunes: lead vocals, claps, mouth percussion
 Carlinhos Brown: lead vocals, handicraft electronics, berimbau, tambourine, drums, bongo drum, conga, shaker, Hammond, karkabou, bacurinha, beatbox, ganzá, afoxés, gong, ride cymbal, cajón, pandeirola, zampogna, Tenori-On, temple block, wood block, gã, Qchord, timbau, tumbadora, heat spreader, gaita de la sierra, rainstick, music box, chimes, snare drum, off-beaat, cowbell, accordion, pans, repinique, agogô, wristband and clef

 Carminho: lead vocals, metallophone, reco-reco and mouth percussion
 Dadi Carvalho: acoustic and electric guitar, sitar, claps, bass, Hammond, piano, mandolin and Fender Rhodes
 Cezar Mendes: acoustic guitar, claps
 Pedro Baby: acoustic and electric guitars
 Pretinho da Serrinha: cavaquinho

Release history

References 

2017 albums
Tribalistas albums
Portuguese-language albums